Oshri Cohen (born 11 January 1984) is an Israeli actor.

Career
In addition to television roles, Cohen has performed in films such as Bonjour Monsieur Shlomi and Campfire.

In 2007 Cohen starred in the Israeli war film Beaufort, which tells the true story of the last unit of soldiers on the legendary Beaufort outpost.

He has also starred in Lost Islands (2008) and Lebanon (2009), which won the Golden Lion at the 66th Venice International Film Festival.

Cohen play guest role of Igal in the fifth season of the American TV series Homeland.

In 2018 he starred as Joseph in the BBC/AMC drama McMafia.

Awards and nominations

References

External links

 
 Oshri Cohen at Zohar agency website

1984 births
Living people
Israeli Jews
Survivor (Israeli TV series) contestants
21st-century Israeli male actors
Israeli male film actors
Israeli male television actors
Israeli male stage actors
Israeli male child actors
Israel Prize in theatre recipients